Punshi is a surname. Notable people with the surname include:

Darshan Punshi, Pakistani politician
Rajit Punshi, Indian businessman